
Year 904 (CMIV) was a leap year starting on Sunday (link will display the full calendar) of the Julian calendar.

Events 
 By place 

 Byzantine Empire 
 July 29 – Sack of Thessalonica: A Muslim fleet, led by the Greek renegade Leo of Tripoli, appears outside Thessalonica and begins its attack after a short and silent inspection of the fortification of the city. After attacks from the sea for two days, the Saracens are able to storm the city walls, overcome the Thessalonians' resistance and capture the city. The sacking continues for a full week, before the raiders depart for their base in the Levant. Having freed 4,000 Muslim prisoners and captured 60 ships, gaining a large loot, they carry off 22,000 men and women as slaves. 
 Arab–Byzantine War: The Byzantines under Andronikos Doukas, along with Eustathios Argyros, campaign against the Abbasids and defeat the Muslim garrisons of Mopsuestia and Tarsus, near Marash (modern Turkey).
 Emperor Leo VI (the Wise) is forced to sign a peace treaty with Simeon I, ruler (knyaz) of the Bulgarian Empire. All Slavic-inhabited lands of Macedonia and southern Albania are ceded to the Bulgarians.

 Europe 
 Summer – King Louis IV (the Child) invites Kurszán, a Hungarian leader (gyula) of the Magyar tribal confederation, and his entourage to negotiate at the Fischa River, but they are killed in an ambush. 
 In Portugal, for the third time in less than 30 years, the Christians take control of Coimbra, this time for almost a century.
 Beginning of the Saeculum obscurum ('Dark Age'), a period of 60 years in which the Papacy was heavily influenced by the powerful Theophylacti family, the counts of Tusculum.

 Britain 
 Prince Hywel ap Cadell of Seisyllwg (Wales) marries Princess Elen of Dyfed. The latter's father, King Llywarch ap Hyfaidd, dies. The throne of Dyfed is claimed by Llywarch's brother, Rhodri ap Hyfaidd, but he is probably forced to flee from Hywel's armies.

 Arabian Empire 
 Winter – Shayban ibn Ahmad ibn Tulun succeeds his nephew Harun ibn Khumarawayh as emir of the Tulunid Dynasty, who is killed in a mutiny during the invasion of Egypt by the Abbasid Caliphate.

 China 
 September 22 – The warlord Zhu Quanzhong kills Emperor Zhao Zong, along with his family and many ministers, after seizing control of the imperial government. Zhu places Zhao Zong's 13-year-old son Ai (Li Zhou) on the imperial throne as a puppet ruler of the Tang Dynasty.
 Zhu Quanzhong has Chang'an, the capital of the Tang Dynasty and the largest city in the ancient world, destroyed, and moves the materials to Luoyang, which becomes the new capital.

 By topic 

 Religion 
 January 29 – Pope Sergius III succeeds Leo V and the deposed Antipope Christopher (both of whom are murdered or exiled) as the 119th pope of the Catholic Church. The ascension of Sergius marks the beginning of the Pornocracy ('rule of the whores'), which will last for 150 years. During this time, the clergy will be sidelined and rule over Rome is dominated by the Roman nobility.
 Sergius III allies himself with Theophylact I, count of Tusculum, who becomes ruler of Rome and the papal administration. Sergius rewards him (for his support and rise of power) with the position of sacri palatii vestararius and essentially becomes his puppet.

Births 
 September 10 – Guo Wei, emperor of Later Zhou (d. 954)
 Æthelwold, bishop of Winchester (or 909)
 Egill Skallagrímsson, Viking warrior and poet (approximate date)
 Yongming Yanshou, Chinese Zen master (d. 975)

Deaths 
 September 22 – Zhao Zong, emperor of the Tang Dynasty (b. 867)
 Abu'l-Abbas Ahmad ibn al-Furat, Abbasid official
 Al-Husayn ibn Zikrawayh, Qarmatian leader
 Al-Qasim ibn Ubayd Allah, Abbasid vizier
 Christopher, antipope of the Catholic Church
 Cui Yin, chancellor of the Tang dynasty (b. 854)
 Du Xunhe, Chinese poet (b. 846)
 Erenfried I, Frankish nobleman
 Harun ibn Khumarawayh, Tulunid emir
 Ímar ua Ímair, Norse king of Dublin 
 John the Old Saxon, abbot of Athelney
 Ki no Tomonori, Japanese poet (approximate date)
 Kurszán, ruler (gyula) of the Magyars
 Lady Zhang, wife of Zhu Quanzhong
 Leo V, pope of the Catholic Church
 Li Shenfu, general of the Tang Dynasty
 Llywarch ap Hyfaidd, king of Dyfed (Wales)
 Tannet of Pagan, king of Burma (b. 859)
 Wigmund, bishop of Dorchester (approximate date) 
 Zhang Jun, chancellor of the Tang Dynasty

References